Zwaan or De Zwaan or van der Zwaan is a Dutch surname. Notable people with the surname include:

Jaap de Zwaan (born 1949), Dutch lawyer and legal scholar
Jan Zwaan (1925–2007), Dutch sprinter
Jo Zwaan (1922–2012), Dutch sprinter
Peter de Zwaan (born 1944), Dutch writer
Alex van der Zwaan, Dutch lawyer
Jeffrey de Zwaan, Dutch darts player

See also
De Zwaan (disambiguation)
9691 Zwaan, a main-belt asteroid

Dutch-language surnames